Mountain Hall is a historic home and farm complex located near Crewe, Nottoway County, Virginia. The house was built about 1797, and is a two-story, three-bay, brick-and-frame, nearly square dwelling with a pyramidal roof. It has a side-hall plan and features four tall and narrow brick chimneys. Also on the property are a contributing L-shaped frame tenant house, two small cemeteries, and one additional grave. It was the home of physician and statesman Dr. James Jones (1772–1848), who died at Mountain Hall and is buried on the property.

It was listed on the National Register of Historic Places in 2002.

References

Houses on the National Register of Historic Places in Virginia
Neoclassical architecture in Virginia
Houses completed in 1797
Houses in Nottoway County, Virginia
National Register of Historic Places in Nottoway County, Virginia